Oskar Mendelsohn (29 March 1912 – 1 August 1993) was a Norwegian educator, non-fiction writer and historian.

He was born in Trondheim. Among his books is a two-volume work on the history of Jews in Norway, published in 1969 and 1986. In 1990 he published a book on the persecution of Jews in Norway during World War II (English edition in 1991). He was decorated Knight, First Class of the Order of St. Olav in 1989.

Bibliography
Jødenes historie i Norge gjennom 300 år (Volume 1 in 1969, Volume 2 in 1986)

References

1912 births
1993 deaths
Writers from Trondheim
Norwegian educators
20th-century Norwegian historians
Historians of World War II
Norwegian non-fiction writers
Norwegian Jews
Jewish historians
20th-century Norwegian writers
Norwegian refugees
Refugees in Sweden
Jewish refugees
20th-century non-fiction writers